"To You I Belong" is a song by Irish girl group B*Witched. Written by the band, Ray "Madman" Hedges, and Martin Brannigan, it was released as the third single from their self-titled debut album (1998) on 7 December 1998. It reached number one on the UK Singles Chart the same month, giving the band their third UK chart-topping single.

Critical reception
Claudia Connell from News of the World wrote, "Like C'est La Vie, this follow-up ballad has a distinctly Irish flavour which lets the girls display their considerable vocal talents." She added, "Yes, this could even knock Cher off the top!"

Music video
The accompanying music video for "To You I Belong" was directed by Katie Bell, who would later also direct the video for "I Shall Be There".  Like the song itself, the video has a Christmas feel to it: it features a cold, icy forest and a large lake.

Live performances
During performances, lead singer Edele Lynch wore finger cymbals which she would clap in time with the cymbals claps in the music. This became another one of B*Witched's signature performance moves, along with dancing an Irish reel for the bridge on "C'est la Vie", the human rollercoaster for "Rollercoaster" and the facial hand gesture for "Blame It on the Weatherman".

Track listings

 UK CD1 
 "To You I Belong"
 "Fly Away"
 "B*Witched's Message to Santa"

 UK CD 2 
 "To You I Belong"
 "To You I Belong" (Amen UK 12-inch mix)
 "To You I Belong" (The Wide Slam mix)

 UK cassette single 
 "To You I Belong"
 "B*Witched's Message to Santa"

 European CD single 
 "To You I Belong"
 "Fly Away"

 Australian CD single 
 "To You I Belong"
 "To You I Belong" (Amen UK 12-inch mix)
 "To You I Belong" (The Wide Slam mix)
 "Fly Away"
 "Rollercoaster" (Amen mix)

Credits and personnel
Credits are lifted from the B*Witched album booklet.

Studio
 Produced in Ray "Madman" Hedges' Mothership

Personnel
 B*Witched – writing
 Ray "Madman" Hedges – writing, production, arrangement
 Martin Brannigan – writing, arrangement
 Erwin Keiles – guitar
 Daniel Collier – fiddle
 Chris "Snake" Davis – tin whistle

Charts

Weekly charts

Year-end charts

Certifications

References

1990s ballads
1998 songs
1998 singles
B*Witched songs
Epic Records singles
Number-one singles in Scotland
Song recordings produced by Ray Hedges
Songs written by Ray Hedges
UK Singles Chart number-one singles